Malathi Rao is an Indian writer. She won the Central Sahitya Akademi award for her English language novel Disorderly Women in 2007.

Early life and background. 
Malathi Rao was born (April 1930) in Bangalore, Karnataka to Chennagiri Padmanabha Rao and Smt. Padmavathi.  She is the eldest of five sisters.  She has an older brother and two younger brothers.  As a young girl, Rao was inspired by the works of Jane Austen, the Brontë sisters and Louisa May Alcott among others. She always had a penchant for writing and pursued English Literature at Bangalore and Mysore Universities.  She epitomized the new generation of her time, as a highly educated independent working woman. 
She was an English Lecturer in Vijaya College, Bangalore and the legendary  Prof.V.T.Srinivasan was principal and Head of the department in the college.
Rao spent a major part of her teaching career in Delhi. She taught English literature at Miranda House, Delhi University.  Highly respected and loved by her peers and students alike, Delhi was her home until she moved back to Bangalore in the mid-nineties. Once in Bangalore, she concentrated on her writing career.

Rao enjoys traveling and has traveled all over the world.  She currently lives in Bengaluru.

Works 

Malathi Rao has written three novels, three collections of short stories and authored several newspaper articles. "The Bridge," "...And in Benares flows the Ganga," and "Come for a Coffee... Please," are among her well-known works.

She rose to prominence with her novel 'Disorderly Women' published in 2007. She won the Sahitya Akademi Award presented to by the Hon. President of India.  Disorderly Women is a story of four Brahmin women in India (pre-independence) who struggle to break the barriers built around them by society.

Rao's next novel is eagerly-awaited and is expected to be published in 2013. It is currently titled Inquisition.

Publications
 The Bridge (novel), Chanakya Publications (Delhi, India), 1990
 Disorderly Women (novel), Dronequill Publishers (Bangalore, India), 2005
 Three collections of short stories 
 Inquisition (upcoming novel)

Awards
 Sahitya Akademi Award in 2007

References

Year of birth missing (living people)
Living people
Writers from Bangalore
Recipients of the Sahitya Akademi Award in English
20th-century Indian novelists
Kannada-language writers
English-language writers from India
Indian women novelists
Women writers from Karnataka
20th-century Indian women writers
Novelists from Karnataka